Philodendron maximum is a species of flowering plant in the family Araceae and genus Philodendron. It is native to Bolivia, Ecuador, and western Brazil in the States of Acre and Mato Grosso.

References

maximum
Flora of South America
Plants described in 1913